Cara Black defeated Brie Rippner in the final, 6–3, 7–5 to win the girls' singles tennis title at the 1997 Wimbledon Championships.

Seeds

 n/a
  Raluca Sandu (second round)
  Cara Black (champion)
  Evie Dominikovic (second round)
  Jasmin Wöhr (third round)
  Brie Rippner (final)
  Tatiana Poutchek (second round)
  Ekaterina Sysoeva (first round)
  Cho Yoon-jeong (second round)
  Maiko Inoue (first round)
  Akiko Morigami (semifinals)
  Katarina Srebotnik (second round)
  Bryanne Stewart (semifinals)
  Irina Selyutina (quarterfinals)
  Cristina Popescu (second round)
  Andrea Šebová (second round)

Draw

Finals

Top half

Section 1

Section 2

Bottom half

Section 3

Section 4

References

External links

Girls' Singles
Wimbledon Championship by year – Girls' singles